The men's individual accuracy competition at the 2018 Asian Games in Puncak, Bogor Regency, Indonesia was held from 20 August to 23 August at the Gunung Mas.

Schedule 
All times are Western Indonesia Time (UTC+07:00)

Results

References

External links 
Rowing at the 2018 Asian Games

Paragliding at the 2018 Asian Games